The Cordillera Septentrional is a mountain range that runs parallel to the north coast of the Dominican Republic, with extensions to the northwest as Tortuga island in Haiti, and to the southeast through lowlands to where it rises as the Sierra de Samaná on the Samaná Peninsula.

There are several small plains between the range and the Atlantic Ocean coastline. Rivers have short courses in the range, and most of them flow to the north into the Atlantic.

References

Mountain ranges of the Dominican Republic
Geography of Duarte Province
Geography of Espaillat Province
Geography of Hermanas Mirabal Province
Geography of María Trinidad Sánchez Province
Geography of Monte Cristi Province
Geography of Puerto Plata Province
Geography of Santiago Province (Dominican Republic)
Geography of Valverde Province